Laadla is a 1966 Hindi-language film directed by Krishnan–Panju and produced by AVM Productions. It is a remake of the Tamil film Annai (1962), which itself was a remake of the Bengali film Maya Mriga (1960). Sudhir Kumar Sawant, who played the role in Dosti movie is also played the role in this movie. The film is remembered for Balraj Sahni, Nirupa Roy and Sudhir Kumar class act.

Synopsis 
Seeta marries a poor man against her family's wishes and becomes pregnant. Savitri, her sister, is childless and yearns to have a baby so Seeta gives away her child to her sister. She names the child Darshan. Now what will be the result when Darshan will know about his real identity?

Cast 
Balraj Sahni as Barrister Brijmohan
Nirupa Roy as Savitri
Pandari Bai as Seeta
Manmohan Krishna as Ratanlal
Sudhir Kumar as Darshan
Kumud Chuggani as Varsha
Jagdeep as Murli
Mukri as Pandit
Shammi as Dhanwanti

Music 
All songs are written by Rajinder Krishan.

Reception

References

External links 

1960s Hindi-language films
1966 films
AVM Productions films
Films directed by Krishnan–Panju
Films scored by Laxmikant–Pyarelal
Hindi remakes of Bengali films
Films based on works by Nihar Ranjan Gupta